The Arab Pharmaceutical Manufacturing Company (APM) is a pharmaceuticals and healthcare company based in Jordan.  Its headquarters are located in Amman.  APM was founded in 1962 and it operates two main production facilities, in Al Salalem and Buhayra.  APM produces dozens of products, its "Products Range" page is located here.

APM is listed on the Amman Stock Exchange's ASE Weighted Index and now APM is listed under AL-Hekma Group .

Operations
APM is active in the export market.  The company works with various international partners, including Japan's Takeda Pharmaceutical Company.

References

External links
Arab Pharmaceutical Manufacturing official website 
Google finance, Arab Pharmaceutical Manufacturing Co. Ltd

1962 establishments in Jordan
Pharmaceutical companies established in 1962
Pharmaceutical companies of Jordan
Companies listed on the Amman Stock Exchange